CKNG-FM is a radio station broadcasting at 92.5 FM in Edmonton, Alberta, Canada. The station plays an adult hits format branded on-air as Chuck @ 92.5. CKNG's studios are located on 84th Street in southeastern Edmonton, while its transmitter is located near Anthony Henday Drive in eastern Edmonton. The station is owned by Corus Entertainment.

CKNG was the ninth most listened to radio station in the Edmonton market in the fall of 2008 but as of fall 2012, the station is ranked twelfth with a 3.3 percent share.

For the 2013 winter season, CKNG-FM was the tenth most listened to radio station with a 5.1% share.

As of Feb 28, 2021, CKNG is the 12th-most-listened-to radio station in the Edmonton market according to a PPM data report released by Numeris.

History

On October 29, 1981, CFCN Communications, Ltd. was awarded a license for a new FM station to broadcast at 92.5 MHz. The station officially launched on August 11, 1982, as CJAX-FM, and aired a country format. In June 1986, CJAX flipped to soft rock, and changed its call letters to CKNG-FM, branding itself as King FM. In 1989, CKNG was sold to Moffat Communications. By 1991, CKNG-FM became Power 92, a CHR/Top 40 station, which launched with The Power by Snap. In August 1992, the station was sold to Westcom Radio. On January 30, 2000, the station was sold to Corus Entertainment, and became a Corus station. On June 27, 2003, CKNG shifted to hot adult contemporary as Power 92.5. After seven months as a hot AC station, on January 13, 2004, the station flipped to adult hits, branded as 92.5 Joe FM, taking the format from sister station CHQT, which returned to oldies. The last song on "Power" was The Power by Snap! (which was also the first song under the station's top 40 "Power 92" era). The station then stunted for an hour with classic TV songs before "Joe" launched at 5 p.m., with the first song being Good Times Roll by The Cars.

On January 9, 2013, at Noon, CKNG flipped back to Hot AC, branded as 92.5 Fresh FM becoming the third Corus radio station to adopt the "Fresh FM" branding. The final song on "Joe" was "Hotel California" by The Eagles, while the first song on "Fresh" was "Locked Out of Heaven" by Bruno Mars.

On October 1, 2014, the station began promoting itself as 92.5 Fresh Radio, and formally changed to that branding on February 13, 2015 as part of Corus's national relaunch of the "Fresh FM" branding.

On August 3, 2018, CKNG flipped back to adult hits now branded as 92.5 The 'Chuck.

In 2020, the station rebranded as Chuck @ 92.5.

References

External links
Chuck @ 92.5
 

Kng
Kng
Kng
Radio stations established in 2004
2004 establishments in Alberta